Admiralty House in London building facing Whitehall, currently used for UK government functions and as ministerial flats. It is a Grade I listed building.

Description
Admiralty House is a four-storey building of yellow brick. The front has a symmetrical facade of three broad bays and one additional small bay at the southern end. The rear facade is of five bays and faces Horse Guards Parade, with a basement-level exit under the corner of the Old Admiralty Building. The front of the house faces Whitehall. It is accessed from the older Ripley Building, to which it is connected.

History
Admiralty House was constructed on the site of two seventeenth century houses; Walsingham House, the London residence of Lady Walsingham, and Pickering House, residence of Sir Gilbert Pickering.

Admiralty House was designed by Samuel Pepys Cockerell, a protégé of Sir Robert Taylor, and opened in 1788. Built at the request of Admiral of the Fleet Viscount Howe, First Lord of the Admiralty, in 1782–83 for "a few small rooms of my own", it was the official residence of First Lord of the Admiralty until 1964, and has also been home to several British Prime Ministers when 10 Downing Street was being renovated.

Winston Churchill lived in the house while serving as First Lord of the Admiralty for two terms, 1911–15 and 1939–40. It now contains government function rooms and three ministerial flats.

References

External links
Admiralty House entry from the Survey of London online, including plans of each floor as of 1935

National government buildings in London
Official residences in the United Kingdom
Grade I listed buildings in the City of Westminster
Grade I listed government buildings
Houses completed in 1788
Houses in the City of Westminster
Robert Taylor buildings
1788 establishments in Great Britain
Prime ministerial homes in the United Kingdom